Club de Futbol Obispado is a football team based in Blanes, Catalonia. Founded in 2005 it plays in Segona Territorial.

External links
 Official website

Football clubs in Catalonia
2005 establishments in Spain